Parrobus of Pottole, sometimes Patrobos, Patrobus or Patrobas, is numbered among the seventy disciples. He was Bishop of Neapolis (Naples) or of Pottole (cf. recounting of Dorotheus below), and is referred to in Scripture when St Paul greets him in his Epistle to the Romans. The Church remembers St. Patrobas on November 5, with his fellow apostles Ss. Hermas, Linus, Gaius and Philologos.

See also
St. Nikolai Velimirovic, The Prologue from Ohrid

References

External links
Apostle Patrobus of the Seventy (Orthodox Church in America)
The Choosing of the Seventy Holy Apostles, as recounted by Dorotheus, Bishop of Tyre  from the site of the Russian Orthodox Church of St. Nicholas (ROCOR)

Seventy disciples
Saints from Roman Italy
Christian saints from the New Testament
1st-century Christian saints
1st-century Italian bishops
Bishops of Naples